Theo Vogelsang (born 23 February 1990) is a German retired footballer who played as an attacking midfielder. He appeared in the Dutch Eerste Divisie for Go Ahead Eagles and in the 3. Liga for Kickers Offenbach.

Honours
Twente
Johan Cruijff Schaal: 2011

References

External links

1990 births
Living people
German people of Russian descent
German footballers
Eredivisie players
Eerste Divisie players
FC Twente players
Go Ahead Eagles players
PEC Zwolle players
3. Liga players
Kickers Offenbach players

Association football midfielders